Canciones del Solar de los Aburridos is the third studio álbum between the duo of Willie Colón and Rubén Blades released on September 20, 1981 by Fania Records. This being the second most successful album of the duo and the one that comes closest to being a post-boogalo album with the sounds of hard salsa characteristic of the Harlow Orchestra.

Background
Canciones del Solar de los Aburridos is the penultimate of four collaborative duo albums produced by Rubén Blades and Willie Colón for Fania. The songs were mainly composed by Blades ranging in theme from the political to the comical/playful. "Tiburón" has since become widely considered one of the highlights of Rubén Blades' songwriting career.

Reception

Although Grammy-nominated, Canciones del Solar de los Aburridos received little air play in the United States at the time of its release due to the political slant of the song "Tiburón" (literally, "Shark") referring to U.S. hegemony in Latin America. The main opposition to the composition came from the Cuban communities in the U.S. In 1991 Willie Colón reflected, "that type of composition caused us a lot of trouble, so much so that at one point when we were doing "Pedro Navaja" and "Tiburón" with Blades, we had to perform in bulletproof vests." However, reception was much warmer in Puerto Rico and other Latin American countries, where "Tiburón", "Te Están Buscando" and "Ligia Elena" were major radio hits.

Track listing

Personnel
Concept and Artistic Direction:
 Rubén Blades & Willie Colon
Arrangements:
 Hector Garrido
 Javier Vazquez
 Luis Cruz
 Marty Sheller
 Rubén Blades
 Willie Colon
Participating Musicians:
 Johnny Andrews
 Ruben Blades
 Sam Burtis
 Milton Cardona
 Willie Colon
 Salvador Cuevas
 Jimmy Delgado
 Andy González
 Reynaldo Jorge
 Lewis Kahn
 Jose Rodríguez
 Joe Santiago
 Joe Torres
Engineers:
 Willie Colon
 Jon Fausty
Assistants:
 Kevin Zambrana
 Henry Monzon
Original Cover Design:
 Izzy Sanabria
Designer:
 Jorge Vargas
Photographer:
 Lee Marshall
Hair Stylist for Willie Colon:
 James Perez
Produced By:
 Willie Colon & Ruben Blades for WAC Productions, Inc.

References

1981 albums
Fania Records albums
Willie Colón albums
Rubén Blades albums
Salsa albums